Yo, minoría absoluta is the eighth studio album by Spanish hard rock band Extremoduro. It was produced by Iñaki "Uoho" Antón and published by DRO on 5 March 2002.

Track listing
Lyrics by Roberto Iniesta, music by Roberto Iniesta and Iñaki Antón.

Personnel 
Extremoduro
 Roberto "Robe" Iniesta – Vocals and guitar
 Iñaki "Uoho" Antón – Guitar
 Miguel Colino – Bass
 José Ignacio Cantera – Drums
Additional musicians
 Fito Cabrales – Backing vocals
 Sara – Backing vocals
 Gino Pavone –Percussion instrument
 Batiz – Slide guitar
 Javi Isasi – Trumpet
 Lourdes Aldekoa – Backing vocals on "Hoy te la meto..."

Charts and certifications

Chart performance

Certifications

References

External links 
 Extremoduro official website (in Spanish)

2002 albums
Extremoduro albums
Spanish-language albums